Whom the Gods Destroy is a 1916 American silent drama film directed by J. Stuart Blackton and Herbert Brenon and starring Alice Joyce, Harry T. Morey, and Marc McDermott. A tale set during the 1916 Irish Easter Rebellion against British rule.

Cast

References

Bibliography
 Donald W. McCaffrey & Christopher P. Jacobs. Guide to the Silent Years of American Cinema. Greenwood Publishing, 1999.

External links
 

1916 films
1916 drama films
1910s English-language films
American silent feature films
Silent American drama films
Films directed by J. Stuart Blackton
Films directed by Herbert Brenon
American black-and-white films
Vitagraph Studios films
1910s American films